Step By Bloody Step is a four-issue textless comic book miniseries published in 2022 by Image Comics.

Synopsis 
The series follows armored giant guarding a helpless child.

Issues

Reception 
Dustin Holland from Comic Book Resources, reviewing the debut, praised artist Bergar. Caitlin Rosberg from The A.V. Club gave the first issue an "A-" and emphasized the chemistry between the writer and the artist. Oliver Sava from Polygon was also pleased with the debut.

References 

2022 comics debuts
Image Comics limited series